"Baby Don't Cry" is the second single released from Australian rock band INXS's eighth studio album, Welcome to Wherever You Are (1992). It was written by Andrew Farriss, who has said it was written about his daughter Grace and how he missed her whilst touring. The single was released only in Europe and Australia.

Incorporating the 60-piece Australian Concert Orchestra, the song reached number 20 in the United Kingdom, number 30 in Australia and Belgium, number 34 in New Zealand, and number 46 in the Netherlands. In 1993, the song's engineer, Niven Garland, was nomination for Engineer of the Year at the 1993 ARIA Music Award for his work on "Baby Don't Cry", "Heaven Sent", and "Taste It".

Track listings
Australian CD and cassette single
 "Baby Don't Cry"
 "Questions"
 "Ptar Speaks"
 "Baby Don't Cry" (vocal and orchestra mix)

UK 7-inch and cassette single
 "Baby Don't Cry"
 "Questions" (instrumental)

UK CD single and Dutch 12-inch single
 "Baby Don't Cry"
 "Questions" (instrumental)
 "Ptar Speaks"
 "Baby Don't Cry" (vocal and orchestra mix)

Charts

Release history

References

INXS songs
1992 singles
1992 songs
East West Records singles
Mercury Records singles
Song recordings produced by Mark Opitz
Songs written by Andrew Farriss